Pelengana (or Pélengana) is a small town and rural commune in the Cercle of Ségou in the Ségou Region of southern-central Mali. The commune contains the town and 25 villages in an area of approximately 359 square kilometers. In the 2009 census it had a population of 56,259. The town of Pelengana lies 5 km southeast of Ségou on the Route Nationale 6.

References

External links
.
.

Communes of Ségou Region